Agiripalli is a town, North suburb of Vijayawada and Mandal Headquarters, in Eluru district of the Indian state of Andhra Pradesh. It is located in Agiripalli mandal Agiripalli is famous for Laxmi Narsimha Swamy Temple.

References 

Villages in Eluru district
Mandal headquarters in Eluru district